The island nation of Barbados is one of the regions which makes up the West Indies cricket team. It has produced international cricketers in all forms of the game—Tests, One Day Internationals (ODIs) and Twenty20 Internationals (T20Is). Barbados contributed three players to the side that competed in the West Indies first Test match against England in 1928—Snuffy Browne, George Challenor and George Francis. The first Barbadian to captain the West Indies was Teddy Hoad during the first Test of England's tour to the West Indies in 1929. Of the nine Barbadians that have held the West Indies captaincy, Garry Sobers has led the side the most times in Tests with 39 appearances.

Sobers holds the record for the most Test runs by a Barbadian for the West Indies, his tally of 8,032 runs is the fourth highest overall for the West Indies. Desmond Haynes has scored the most ODI runs by a Barbadian for the West Indies, The only West Indian to have bettered Haynes's 8,648 ODI runs is Brian Lara. Gordon Greenidge is the second highest scoring Barbadian in both Tests and ODIs. Malcolm Marshall has taken the most Test wickets by a Barbadian with 376, which is the third highest overall for the West Indies. Marshall also holds the record for the most ODI wickets by a Barbadian with 157. Joel Garner is the second highest wicket taking Barbadian in Tests and Jason Holder has taken the second highest amount of wickets by a Barbadian in ODIs. 

Other notable Barbadian international cricketers include "The Three Ws"—Everton Weekes, Frank Worrell and Clyde Walcott. They have each scored over 3,000 Test runs for the West Indies and a stand at the Kensington Oval, home of the Barbados Cricket Association, is named after them.

Key
 Apps denotes the number of appearances the player has made.
 Runs denotes the number of runs scored by the player.
 Wkts denotes the number of wickets taken by the player.

Statistics correct as of: October 2022

See also
List of West Indies Test cricketers
List of West Indies ODI cricketers
List of West Indies Twenty20 International cricketers
List of Barbadian representative cricketers

Notes
 Cummins played 13 ODIs for Canada.

References

Barbados
International cricketers from Barbados

International cricketers from Barbados